Simon Thirsk (born 15 May 1977 in Cape Town) is a retired South African swimmer, who specialised in backstroke events.

Career and Awards
Thirsk won a gold medal in the 100 m backstroke at the 1999 Summer Universiade, and later represented South Africa at the 2000 Summer Olympics. While residing in the United States, Thirsk played for the University of Hawaii's swimming and diving team, also known as the Hawaii Rainbow Warriors, under head coach Sam Freas.

Thirsk burst onto the global scene at the 1999 Summer Universiade in Palma de Mallorca. In the 100 m backstroke, he fought off a challenge from Japan's Keitaro Konnai to power home with South Africa's first ever gold in 55.97.

At the 2000 Summer Olympics in Sydney, Thirsk competed only in two swimming events. After winning a gold medal from the University Games, his entry time of 55.97 was officially accredited under a FINA A-standard. In the 100 m backstroke, Thirsk challenged seven other swimmers in heat six, including Cuba's Olympic silver medalist Rodolfo Falcón and Australia's overwhelming favourite Matt Welsh. He rounded out the field to last place and thirtieth overall by a 2.36-second deficit behind winner Welsh in 57.06. Thirsk also teamed up with Brett Petersen, Nicholas Folker, and Theo Verster in the 4 × 100 m medley relay. Leading off a backstroke leg in heat two, Thirsk recorded a split of 56.88, but the South Africans finished the race in fourth place and thirteenth overall with a final time of 3:42.44.

Three years later, at the 2003 All-Africa Games in Abuja, Nigeria, Thirsk collected a total of three medals: two silvers in the 50 m backstroke (27.04) and 100 m backstroke (57.60), and a single bronze in the 200 m backstroke (2:09.79).

References

External links
News 24 Profile

1977 births
Living people
Alumni of Camps Bay High School
South African male swimmers
Olympic swimmers of South Africa
Swimmers at the 2000 Summer Olympics
Male backstroke swimmers
Sportspeople from Cape Town
Hawaii Rainbow Warriors swimmers
University of Hawaiʻi alumni
African Games silver medalists for South Africa
African Games medalists in swimming
Universiade medalists in swimming
African Games bronze medalists for South Africa
Competitors at the 2003 All-Africa Games
Universiade gold medalists for South Africa
Medalists at the 1999 Summer Universiade